Off the Wall is a 1979 album by Michael Jackson.

Off the Wall may also refer to:

Music

Albums
 Off the Wall (Budd Johnson album), 1964
 Off the Wall, a 1978 album by Fat Larry's Band
 Off the Wall, a 1978 album by Ray Wylie Hubbard
 Off the Wall, a 1978 album by Roger Miller
 Off the Wall, a 1980 album by The Ugly Ducklings
 Off the Wall, a 1985 album by Yoshi Wada
 Off the Wall, a 1997 album by John Abercrombie (as Lester LaRue) and Dan Wall
 Off the Wall, a 2012 album by Yuksek
 Off the Wall,  concept album of a 'revuesical' by Don Black and Geoff Stephens

Songs
 "Off the Wall" (Little Walter song), 1953
 "Off the Wall" (Michael Jackson song), 1979
 "Off the Wall", by the Cheetah Girls from TCG, 2007
 "Off the Wall", by Eminem and Redman from the Nutty Professor II: The Klumps film soundtrack, 2000
 "Off the Wall!", by XXXTentacion and Ski Mask the Slump God from Members Only, Vol. 3, 2017
 "Baby (Off the Wall)", by Sirens from Control Freaks, 2004

Other
 Off the Wall Studios, a recording studio operated by Robert Venable

Sports and games 
 Off the Wall (1984 video game), a 1984 Bally/Sente Technologies arcade game
 Off the Wall (1989 video game), a 1989 video game
 Off the Wall (1991 video game), a 1991 arcade game
 Off the Wall (game), a street game featured in the 2010 documentary film New York Street Games

Television and film

Film
 Off the Wall (1981 film), a Canadian art documentary by Derek May 
 Off the Wall (1983 film), an American comedy starring Paul Sorvino
 Off the Wall, a 1979 short film starring Shane Stanley

Television and video
 Off the Wall (game show), an American game show that aired on Disney Channel
 Off the Wall (1986 TV series), a 1986 American late-night sketch-comedy show featuring Louise DuArt
 Off the Wall, a 1978 HBO comedy special by Robin Williams
 "Off the Wall" (The Bad Girls Club), a 2009 episode of the TV series The Bad Girls Club
 "Off the Wall", a 1999 episode of the TV series Casualty
 "Off the Wall", a 1991 episode of the TV series MacGyver
 "Off the Wall", a 2011 episode of the TV series Pawn Stars
 "Off the Wall", a 2003 episode of the TV series NYPD Blue
 "Off the Wall", a 1976 episode of the TV series Big John, Little John
 "Off the Wall", a 2005 episode of the TV series Firehouse Tales

Other uses 
 Off the Wall (clothing retailer), a Canadian clothing retailer
 Off the Wall Productions, a professional theatre company in Washington, Pennsylvania, U.S.
 Off the Wall, a radio show hosted by Emmanuel Goldstein on WUSB-FM and the website of 2600: The Hacker Quarterly
 Off the Wall Stage Series, a series of productions by 4th Wall Theatre, Inc. at Bloomfield College, New Jersey, U.S.
 "Off the Walls", poster-sized news publications produced by the Stony Brook Independent, Stony Brook University, New York, U.S.